David Lancy (born 1945) is an American anthropologist and professor emeritus at Utah State University. He has made contributions to childhood development and the concept of "chore curriculum." He has been called "perhaps the world’s leading expert on child-parent relationships throughout the world." In 2001, he was awarded the Carnegie Foundation's Professor of the Year.

Education and early career 
David Lancy was born and raised in Pennsylvania. He received his B.A. in 1967 from Yale University, a master's degree in psychology from University of California, Irvine in 1969, and a Ph.D. in International and Development Education from the University of Pittsburgh in 1975. In 1979, he was an N.I.M.H. fellow at the University of California, Los Angeles.

Selected publications

Awards
 1989 Fulbright Fellowship, Trinidad & Tobago
 1995 Fulbright Fellowship, Sweden
 2001 Professor of the Year, Carnegie Foundation
 2011 D.W. Thorne Career Research Award, Utah State University

See also

References

External links
 The Association for the Anthropological Study of Play
 Anthropology of Children and Youth Interest Group
 David Lancypublications indexed by Google Scholar

1945 births
Living people
American anthropologists
Cultural anthropologists
Yale University alumni
University of California, Irvine alumni
University of Pittsburgh alumni
Utah State University faculty
Childhood
Parenting